St. Thomas Aquinas Church or Newman Chapel is a Roman Catholic church within the St. George campus of the University of Toronto in Toronto, Ontario, Canada. It was built in 1926-1927 as a chapel for the Newman Centre next door. In 1995, it became a quasi-parish church. It is situated on the corner of Hoskin Avenue and St. George Street in Toronto, next to Massey College.

History

Origin
Before the site was a church, it was a coach house attached to the home of Wilmot Deloui Matthews. He was a businessman, owner of W. D. Matthews and one-time president of the Toronto Board of Trade. He built the house from 1890 to 1891. He died in 1919 and the whole site was purchased by the Newman Club in 1922. At first, before the church was built, Mass was held in the Oak Room of the house next door.

As the size of the congregation increased, it was realised that a larger space for Mass was required. Plans were drawn up to replace the coach house with a chapel. To make the most of the available space, the chapel was designed to be rectangular and perpendicular to the street.

Construction
The Gothic Revival style structure was built from 1926 to 1927. After it was finished it was blessed by the Archbishop of Toronto, Neil McNeil. On 27 March 1927, he dedicated the chapel to St. Thomas Aquinas. Because of its connection to the Newman Centre, it was known by students on campus as the Newman Chapel. From 1913 to 1936, the Newman Centre and chapel were served by the Paulist Fathers at St. Peter's Church, Toronto.

Over time, renovations were made to the church. It was altered after the Second Vatican Council to conform to the promulgated liturgical changes. In 1973, it was added to the Toronto Historical Board's inventory of historical buildings by the Ontario Heritage Trust.

In 1995, the Archdiocese of Toronto designated the chapel a quasi-parish church.

From 1999 to 2000, a renovation was undertaken to install windows depicting prominent 20th-century Christians.

In 2014, the roof was renovated. It was the first time it had been replaced in 88 years.

Interior
The church was built using Credit Valley and Indiana limestone. The roof is supported by arch-braced trusses and beams made of dark stained British Columbia fir. It originally featured two windows near the entrance depicting the patrons of the church, Thomas Aquinas and John Henry Newman.

The windows installed in the west wall of the church in 2000 show Pope John XXIII, Kateri Tekakwitha, Jerzy Popiełuszko, Georges Vanier, Pauline Vanier, Gianna Beretta Molla, Franz Jägerstätter, Mother Teresa, Edith Stein, Thérèse of Lisieux, Óscar Romero, Pier Giorgio Frassati and André Bessette.

Parish
The parish has two Sunday Masses every week, at 11:00am and at 7:00pm. It also holds daily Mass at 12:15pm from Monday to Friday and 9:30am Saturday. Confessions are available before all Masses.

Music
The church also has two music ministries; one for the 11:00 AM and another for the 7:00 PM Masses. The music ministry for the 11:00 AM Mass which is led by Christina Labriola, plays in a traditional style with SATB choir and piano, playing music from GIA's Gather Hymnal. The 7:00 PM music ministry, led by Charles Min, plays in a contemporary style, influenced by pop, rock, folk, and musical theatre genres.  They primarily use material from Christian Contemporary Music artists, and also use the Gather Hymnal.  Their music ministry consists of a full rhythm section, violin, multiple cantors, and choir.

Stained glass windows

See also
Newman Centre, Toronto

References

External links

 Newman Centre Catholic Mission site

Roman Catholic churches in Toronto
20th-century Roman Catholic church buildings in Canada
Roman Catholic Archdiocese of Toronto
Gothic Revival architecture in Toronto
Gothic Revival church buildings in Canada
Roman Catholic churches completed in 1927
University of Toronto buildings